Karie (English translation: charcoal) is a 2015 Indian Malayalam-language film. It is the debut feature film by Naranipuzha Shanavas.

Karie transcends and travels with time. It encapsulates the essence of travel from north to south of Kerala and a mythical dance form named Karinkaliyattam (Karie). Even though south and north differ in all aspects of life the only one thing which doesn't change in common is caste/class difference.

The Karinkaliyattam has a color revenge, as when the lower caste people come as Karinkali (God) the upper caste has to bow their head in front of them. The artist who is in the skin of Karinkali the god is dual personality as he is lower caste human being and God at the same time. Then the real travel begins and goes through troubled waters of real life and Karie, God and human being all become inseparable from each other.
Karie was nominated for the National Award in 2015.

Plot 
Gopu Kesav Menon and Bilal travel from south to north and on the way they visit Dineshan's home who is an employee of Gopu. When they reach the home there is some preparations happening for an offering to a nearby temple in the form of a mythical dance form named Karinkaliyattam (Karie). They hand over some money to Dineshan's father. The paradox is this money is used to conduct the dance as an offering to goddess to get a permanent visa in Gopu's firm, which Gopu can easily give if he decides.

Cast
 Gopu Keshav as Gopu Kesav Menon
 Rammohan as Bilal
 K. T. Satheesan as Karingali
 Pradeep as Shibutan
 Velayudhan as Dineshan's Father 
 Parukutti Amma as Dineshan's Mother
 Unni Kumbidi as Police
 Leo as Police

References

2010s Malayalam-language films